Harry Thomas Worthington (December 28, 1891 – March 4, 1990) was an American track and field athlete who competed in the 1912 Summer Olympics.

Biography
In 1912 he finished fourth the long jump competition. He was the AAU and IC4A long jump champion in 1915–16.

He died in Flushing, New York, on March 4, 1990.

References

External links
list of American athletes

1891 births
American male long jumpers
Olympic track and field athletes of the United States
Athletes (track and field) at the 1912 Summer Olympics
1990 deaths